Panama competed at the 2014 Summer Youth Olympics, in Nanjing, China from 16 August to 28 August 2014.

Athletics

Panama qualified three athletes.

Qualification Legend: Q=Final A (medal); qB=Final B (non-medal); qC=Final C (non-medal); qD=Final D (non-medal); qE=Final E (non-medal)

Boys
Track & road events

Field Events

Girls
Track & road events

Golf

Panama was given one spot to compete from the Tripartite Commission.

Individual

Team

Gymnastics

Artistic Gymnastics

Panama was given a quota to compete by the tripartite committee.

Boys

Swimming

Panama qualified three swimmers.

Boys

Girls

References

2014 in Panamanian sport
Nations at the 2014 Summer Youth Olympics
Panama at the Youth Olympics